Gabriella Csire (born 21 April 1938, Ocna Mureș) is a Romanian writer, children's literature author. Children: Csire Gábor

Life 
Born into an ethnic Hungarian family, at the age of two she moved with her parents to Cluj (Kolozsvár), where she graduated from high school (1954). Later she graduated from the former Bolyai University (Babeș-Bolyai University) (1959), at the departament of Hungarian Language and Literature. In 1959 she moved to Bucharest, where she was a redactor at  Irodalmi Könyvkiadó (National Publishing for Literature), then at journals/newspapers, most of them being youth magazines: Tanügyi Újság, Előre and Jóbarát, and Cimbora  between 1990–92, where she worked as an editor in chief. She wrote articles, short stories, fairy tales and fairy novels. She is member of the Writers' Union of Romania.

Published books

 Pikk-pakk lámpa. Turpi meséi (ill: Szabó Erzsébet), 2015.
 Görög regevilág, 2014.
 Erdélyi mondák és históriák, 2012.
 Tündér Ibolya (ill. Péter Katalin), 2011.
 Észak ékes csillaga (ill. Péter Katalin), 2011.
 Kalevala messze földjén (ill. Szabó Erzsébet) 2011.
 A magyarság mondáiból, 2010.
 A nagy erejű Toldi (ill. Péter Katalin), 2010.
 Csaba és a Nap fia (ill: Emese Keller), 2009.
 Lúdas Matyi három arca (ill: Emese Keller), 2009.
 Szuhay Mátyás tréfája (ill: Emese Keller), 2009.
 Árgirus királyfi és az aranyalmák (ill: Emese Keller), 2009.
 A párjanincs János Vitéz (ill: Emese Keller), 2009.
 Vitéz Háry János (ill: Emese Keller), 2009.
 Az Ótestamentum igazgyöngyei (ill: Emese Keller), 2008.
 Egy magyar kalandor ifjúsága (ill: Stefánia Felszegi), 2008.
 Csillagregék (Gábor Csire ral), 2007.
 Szavak Háza – A varázsló kosara (with József Csire), 2007.
 Trója, 2006.
 Gilgames álmai 2005.
 Görög regevilág. Héroszok, 2005.
 Görög regevilág. Istenek, 2004.
 Az aranyhal palotája (ill: Stefánia Felszegi), 2004.
 Bűvös dalnok (with József Csire), 2003
 Turpi lak (ill: Stefánia Felszegi), 2002.
 Itt járt Mátyás király (ill: Stefánia Felszegi), 2001.
 Münchhausen báró barangolásai (ill: Stefánia Felszegi), 2001.
 Legendele constelațiilor (ill: Marian Voinea), 2001.
 Kalevala, țara îndepărtată (ill: Marian Voinea), 2001.
 Elek apó Cimboraja, 2000.
 Odüsszeusz, a vándor (ill: István Damó), 2000.
 Ráma és Szítá csodálatos története, 1997.
 Bambuszka (with Gábor Csire), 1997.
 Áprilisi tréfa, 1996.
 9 bolygó meg 1 Nap (with Gábor Csire), 1996.
 Csillagregék (with Gábor Csire), 1995.
 Kalevala messze földjén (ill: Ilona Vándor-Várhelyi), 1995.
 Elek apó Cimborája (ill. Levente Csutak), 1994.
 Kaktusztövis (ill: Emese Keller) 1991.
 Álomfestő Bíborka - A Kása-barlang titka (ill: István Damó) 1988.
 A forrás titka (ill: István Damó), 1985.
 A varázsló kosara (József Csire fel), 1984.
 Mókus Pali vándorúton (ill: Emese Keller), 1983.
 Az anyám és én (ill: Sándor Plugor), 1982.
 Álomhajó (ill: Lajos Balogh), 1980.
 Bűvös dalnok (with József Csire), (ill: Lajos Balogh) 1978.
 Turpi és Világjáró Kópé (ill: Sándor Karancsi), 1976.
 Turpi meséi (ill: László Labancz), 1971.
 Pandóra szelencéi (ill: V. Socolnic), 1969.

Sources
 "Székely Útkereső" magazine: 1998/1-2-3-4; p. 8. 
 Romániai Magyar Irodalmi Lexikon (Romano-Hungarian Literary Encyclopedia) 

Romanian women writers
Romanian people of Hungarian descent
1938 births
Romanian children's writers
People from Ocna Mureș
Living people
Romanian women children's writers